Shahrivar (also Romanized as Shahrīvar; also known as Shahr-e Būr and Shohrehvar) is a village in Sardabeh Rural District, in the Central District of Ardabil County, Ardabil Province, Iran.The majority of the village's population are Russian-Russian immigrants. Historical sites in this village include the Shahrivar hill of the Sasanian period - Parthian period. This work has been registered as one of Iran's national monuments on 4 December 2008. At the 2006 census, its population was 474, in 118 families.

References 

Towns and villages in Ardabil County